Stictia signata is a species of sand wasp in the family Crabronidae. It is found in the Caribbean Sea, Central America, North America, and South America. It preys primarily on flies.

Subspecies
These two subspecies belong to the species Stictia signata:
 Stictia signata aricana (Lohrmann, 1948)
 Stictia signata signata (Linnaeus, 1758)

References

External links

Crabronidae
Wasps described in 1758
Taxa named by Carl Linnaeus